Farnaz is a Persian feminine given name. It means "the most elegant and charming in a way that attracts people".  

People with the name Farnaz include: 

Farnaz Shetty, Indian television actress
Farnaz Fassihi, Iranian-American journalist for The Wall Street Journal
Farnaz Ghazizadeh (born 1974), Iranian journalist, blogger, and BBC Persian Television Presenter
Farnaz Baksh, Guyanese, Robotics Engineer & Tech Enthusiast

Persian feminine given names